These Foolish Things is the debut solo studio album by Bryan Ferry, who at the time was still Roxy Music's lead vocalist. The album was released in October 1973 on Island Records in the United Kingdom and Atlantic Records in the United States. It is considered to be a departure from Roxy Music's sound, because it consists entirely of cover versions, mainly of standard songs. These Foolish Things was a commercial and critical success, peaking at number five on the UK Albums Chart. It received a gold certification from the British Phonographic Industry in May 1974.

Most of the tracks on the album were personal favorites of Ferry's, and spanned several decades from 1930s standards such as the title track through 1950s Elvis Presley to Bob Dylan and the Rolling Stones.

"A Hard Rain's a-Gonna Fall" was released as a single and reached number 10 in the UK Singles Chart in September 1973

Composition
Speaking about the album in 1973, Ferry said: "It's a very catholic selection, I've given up trying to please all of the people all of the time. Some will like it for one reason, some for another. And some will presumably dislike it for the wrong reasons though I hope the general point of it will be understood. It's amusement value. I think."

Critical reception

Robert Christgau found that Ferry "both undercuts the inflated idealism of [Bob Dylan's 'A Hard Rain's a-Gonna Fall'] and reaffirms its essential power", establishes Lesley Gore's "It's My Party" as a protest song, and with his cover of "These Foolish Things", "reminds us that pop is only, well, foolish things, many of which predate not only Andy Warhol but rock and roll itself." In 1983's The New Rolling Stone Record Guide, Dave Marsh wrote:

In AllMusic, critic Ned Raggett said that throughout These Foolish Things, "Ferry's instantly recognizable croon carries everything to a tee, and the overall mood is playful and celebratory", calling the album "one of the best of its kind by any artist." Rob Sheffield, in 2004's The New Rolling Stone Album Guide, praised it as a "conceptual and musical tour de force". In 2010, Rhapsody listed These Foolish Things as one of the best covers albums.

Track listing

Personnel

Musicians 

 Bryan Ferry – lead vocals, acoustic piano
 Eddie Jobson – keyboards, synthesizers, violin
 David Skinner – acoustic piano 
 John Porter – guitars, bass
 Phil Manzanera – guitar solo (10)
 Paul Thompson – drums
 John Punter – additional drums (7, 8)
 Roger Ball – alto saxophone, baritone saxophone, horn arrangements
 Ruan O'Lochlainn – alto saxophone solo (11)
 Malcolm Duncan – tenor saxophone
 Henry Lowther – trumpet
 Robbie Montgomery – backing vocals (1, 8)
 Jessie Davis – backing vocals (1, 8) 
 The Angelettes – backing vocals (2–7, 9–13)

Production 

 Bryan Ferry – producer
 John Porter – producer
 John Punter – producer, engineer
 Steve Nye – engineer
 Andy Arthurs – assistant engineer
 Nicholas De Ville – cover design
 Karl Stoecker – photography

Charts

Weekly charts

Year-end charts

Certifications

References

Bryan Ferry albums
1973 debut albums
Covers albums
Island Records albums
Albums produced by John Punter
Albums produced by John Porter (musician)
Albums recorded at AIR Studios